Punctelia subrudecta is a species of lichen in the family Parmeliaceae. It was described as a new species by Finnish lichenologist William Nylander as Parmelia subrudecta. Hildur Krog transferred it to the genus Punctelia in 1982.

References

subrudecta
Lichen species
Taxa named by William Nylander (botanist)
Lichens described in 1886